Charles Ernest William Bryant (1902–1960) was a barrister and amateur ornithologist. He was admitted to the Victorian Bar in 1929. He first joined Vowell & A’Beckett and later was a partner in Moule, Hamilton and Derham, a Melbourne firm of barristers and solicitors.

A member of the Royal Australasian Ornithologists Union (RAOU), he was editor of its journal, the Emu, from 1929 to 1960, the year of his death, a period of 31 years.  He also served on the RAOU Checklist Committee 1938–1960, and as RAOU President 1955–1957.

He died at his home from a heart attack on 27 October 1960. He was survived by his wife Dulcie and their son David.

He accumulated a considerable collection of books in his lifetime with works on ornithology predominating.

Awards
In 1957 he was awarded the Australian Natural History Medallion.

References

Robin, Libby. (2001). The Flight of the Emu: a hundred years of Australian ornithology 1901-2001. Carlton, Vic. Melbourne University Press. 

Australian ornithologists
1902 births
1960 deaths
20th-century Australian zoologists
Australian book and manuscript collectors